Longton Township is a township in Elk County, Kansas, United States.  As of the 2000 census, the population was 530.

Geography
According to the USGS, it contains one cemetery, Longton.

The streams of Clear Creek, Hitchen Creek and West Painterhood Creek run through this township.

Education
Longton Township is home to Elk Valley High School.

References
 USGS Geographic Names Information System (GNIS)

External links
 City-Data.com

Townships in Elk County, Kansas
Townships in Kansas